Aboa (from the Latin name of Turku) is a seasonal Finnish research station in Antarctica, located in Queen Maud Land, about  from the coast, on a nunatak called Basen in the Vestfjella Mountains.

Facilities and purpose
Opened in 1988, the station was designed and built by VTT Technical Research Centre of Finland, and funded by the Finnish Ministry of Trade and Industry (now part of the Finnish Ministry of Employment and the Economy).

The station is used in the Antarctic summer only. Currently the station has living and work space for expeditions of 15 people, and allows temporary living space for up to 17 people.

Together, Aboa and Wasa form the Nordenskiöld Base and the two stations work in close cooperation.

This article includes material from Finnish Wikipedia article Aboa (asema), revision as of 2009-03-02.

See also
 List of Antarctic research stations
 List of Antarctic field camps

References

Outposts of Queen Maud Land
Buildings and structures completed in 1988
Princess Martha Coast
1988 establishments in Antarctica